Seh Riz (also Romanized as Seh Rīz; also known as Serīz) is a village in Sarrud-e Shomali Rural District, in the Central District of Boyer-Ahmad County, Kohgiluyeh and Boyer-Ahmad Province, Iran. At the 2006 census, its population was 213, in 45 families.

References 

Populated places in Boyer-Ahmad County